Carlton Township is one of the twenty-one townships of Tama County, Iowa, United States.

History
Carlton Township was organized in 1854. It is named for Judge James P. Carlton, of Iowa.

References

Townships in Tama County, Iowa
Townships in Iowa